The George Carpenter House is a historic house located at 53 South Main Street, in Uxbridge, Massachusetts.  Built c. 1815–25, this two-story brick building is an excellent local example of high-style Federal architecture.  The nearly square building has a hip roof with interior end wall chimneys.  Its front entry is set beneath an elliptical arch supported by colonnettes.  Its owner, George Carpenter, was a manufacturer of textile processing machinery.

On October 7, 1983, it was added to the National Register of Historic Places, where it is listed at 67 South Main.

See also
National Register of Historic Places listings in Uxbridge, Massachusetts

References

Houses in Uxbridge, Massachusetts
National Register of Historic Places in Uxbridge, Massachusetts
Houses on the National Register of Historic Places in Worcester County, Massachusetts